Just a Game is the third studio album by Canadian hard rock band Triumph, released in 1979. The album contains one of Triumph's most popular songs on FM album-oriented radio, "Lay it on the Line", and the Top 40 hit "Hold On", which peaked at No. 38 on the Billboard Hot 100 and at No. 33 in Canada.

Artwork
The vinyl LP version of the album featured a sleeve that folded open to reveal a board game (though later pressings just contained a regular vinyl sleeve without this). According to a Rockline interview, the board game was Rik Emmett's idea, but Mike Levine was the one who actually designed it and decided to make it impossible to win.

The front cover of the album revealed a futuristic world where every symbol depicts a song featured on the album.

Track listing

Vinyl release
Side 1
 "Movin' On" (Moore) – 4:07
 "Lay It on the Line" (Emmett) – 4:02
 "Young Enough to Cry" (Moore) – 6:03
 "American Girls" (Moore) – 5:01
Side 2
 "Just a Game" (Emmett) – 6:13
 "Fantasy Serenade" (Emmett) – 1:39
 "Hold On" (Emmett) – 6:04
 "Suitcase Blues" (Emmett) – 3:01

Cassette release
 "Movin' On" (Moore) – 4:07
 "Young Enough to Cry" (Moore) – 6:03
 "American Girls" (Moore) – 5:01
 "Lay It on the Line" (Emmett) – 4:02
 "Suitcase Blues" (Emmett) – 3:01
 "Just a Game" (Emmett) – 6:13
 "Fantasy Serenade" (Emmett) – 1:39
 "Hold On" (Emmett) – 6:04

CD release
 "Movin' On" (Moore) – 4:07
 "Lay It on the Line" (Emmett) – 4:02
 "Young Enough to Cry" (Moore) – 6:03
 "American Girls" (Moore) – 5:01
 "Just a Game" (Emmett) – 6:13
 "Fantasy Serenade" (Emmett) – 1:39
 "Hold On" (Emmett) – 6:04
 "Suitcase Blues" (Emmett) – 3:01

Personnel
 Rik Emmett – guitars, vocals
 Gil Moore – drums, vocals
 Mike Levine – bass, keyboards
 Laurie Delgrande – keyboards
 Mike Danna – keyboards
 Beau David – background vocals
 Elaine Overholt – background vocals
 Gord Waszek – background vocals
 Colina Phillips – background vocals
 Rosie Levine – background vocals

Production
 Michael Levine – producer
 Mike Jones – engineer
 Doug Neil – assistant
 George Semkiw – remixing
 Hugh Cooper – assistant
 John Golden – digital mastering
 Brett Zilahi – digital re mastering
 Rene Zamic – cover illustration
 Gary Kremnitz – photography
 Lynne Waggett – photography
 Jim Murray – photography
 Alan Henry – crew
 Dave Dickson – crew
 Peter Woods – crew

Charts

Certifications

External links
 Just A Game entry at The Official Triumph Homepage

1979 albums
Triumph (band) albums
Albums produced by Mike Levine (musician)
Albums recorded at Metalworks Studios
Attic Records albums
RCA Records albums